Roosarna, also known as the Kjell Roos Band, is a dansband in Vallsta, Sweden. The band was formed in 1969 by the brothers Kjell, Anders and Sven-Åke as Bröderna Roos (the Roos brothers). In the mid-1970s they changed their name to Roosarna. Since 1975, it is a full-time playing band. In 1982, the band began to collaborate with Kikki Danielsson.

In 1990 the cooperation was increased when they began to appear as Kikki Danielsson & Roosarna, and scored several Svensktoppen hits during the 1990s. Kikki Danielsson & Roosarna was awarded a Grammis in 1994 for the album Vet du vad jag vet. In September 1996 they changed their name to Kikki Danielssons orkester.

In 1998, the band toured in church buildings, and the same year released material in Germany. When Kikki Danielsson left the band in February 2000, the band took the name Kjell Roos Band. In February 2003, however, Kikki Danielsson once again began to tour with the band.

For the 2008–2009 Christmas and holiday season the band began to tour with Magnus Carlsson. In 2011 and 2012 the band accompanied Johnny Logan during a church tour.

Members
Kjell Roos – vocals and guitar
Kikki Danielsson – lead vocals. Left the band in 1999.
Lennart Brink – bass
Kent Lovén – drums
Danne Wirenberg – guitar
Marcus Fernholm – keyboard

Discography

Albums
 I kväll är det party (1985)
Livet är nu (1988)
På lugnare vatten (1990)
En enda gång (1992)
Vet du vad jag vet (1994)
Hem till Norden (1996)
Ett hus med många rum (1997)
Dagar som kommer och går (1999)
Vad livet har att ge (2005)

References

External links
Grammis awards of 1994

Musical groups established in 1969
Dansbands
1969 establishments in Sweden
Gävleborg County